Spanish names are the traditional way of identifying, and the official way of registering, a person in Spain. They comprise a given name (simple or composite) and two surnames (the first surname of each parent). Traditionally, the first surname is the father's first surname, and the second is the mother's. Since 1999, the order of the surnames in a family is decided when registering the first child, but the traditional order is nearly universally chosen (99.53% of the time).

The practice is to use one given name and the first surname generally (e.g. "Miguel de Unamuno" for Miguel de Unamuno y Jugo); the complete name is reserved for legal, formal and documentary matters. Both surnames are sometimes systematically used when the first surname is very common (e.g., Federico García Lorca, Pablo Ruiz Picasso or José Luis Rodríguez Zapatero) to get a more distinguishable name. In these cases, it is even common to use only the second surname, as in "Lorca", "Picasso" or "Zapatero". This does not affect alphabetization: "Lorca", the Spanish poet, must be alphabetized in an index under "García Lorca", not "Lorca" or "García".

Basic structure
Currently in Spain, people bear a single or composite given name ( in Spanish) and two surnames ( in Spanish).

A composite given name comprises two (or more) single names; for example, Juan Pablo is considered not to be a first and a second forename, but a single composite forename.

The two surnames refer to each of the parental families. Traditionally, a person's first surname is the father's first surname, while their second surname is the mother's first surname. For example, if a man named Eduardo Fernández Garrido marries a woman named María Dolores Martínez Ruiz (note that women do not change their name with marriage) and they have a child named José, there are several legal options, but their child would most usually be known as José Fernández Martínez.

Since 2013, if the parents of a child were unable to agree on the order of surnames, an official would decide which is to come first, with the paternal name being the default option. The only requirement is that every son and daughter must have the same order of the surnames, so they cannot change it separately. Since June 2017, adopting the paternal name first is no longer the standard method, and parents are required to sign an agreement wherein the name order is expressed explicitly. The law also grants a person the option, upon reaching adulthood, of reversing the order of their surnames. However, this legislation only applies to Spanish citizens; people of other nationalities are issued the surname indicated by the laws of their original country.

Each of these two surnames can also be composite in itself, with the parts usually linked by:
the conjunction y or e (and),
the preposition de (of), or
a hyphen.
For example, a person's name might be Juan Pablo Fernández de Calderón García-Iglesias, consisting of a forename (Juan Pablo), a paternal surname (Fernández de Calderón), and a maternal surname (García-Iglesias).

There are times when it is impossible, by inspection of a name, to correctly analyse it. For example, the writer Sebastià Juan Arbó was alphabetised wrongly by the Library of Congress for many years under "Arbó", assuming that Sebastià and Juan were both given names. However, "Juan" was actually his first surname.

Resolving questions like this, which typically involve very common names ("Juan" is rarely a surname), often requires the consultation of the person involved or legal documents pertaining to them.

Forms of address
A man named José Antonio Gómez Iglesias would normally be addressed as either señor Gómez or señor Gómez Iglesias instead of señor Iglesias, because Gómez is his first surname. Furthermore, Mr. Gómez might be informally addressed as
 José Antonio
 José
 Pepe (nickname for José)
 Antonio 
 Toño (nickname for Antonio)
 Joselito, Josito, Joselillo, Josico or Joselín (diminutives of José)
 Antoñito, Toñín, Toñito, Ñoño or Nono (diminutives of Antonio)
 Joseán (apocopation).
Very formally, he could be addressed with an honorific such as don José Antonio or don José.

It is not unusual, when the first surname is very common, like García in the example above, for a person to be referred to formally using both family names, or casually by their second surname only. For example, José Luis Rodríguez Zapatero (elected President of the Spanish Government in the 2004 and 2008 general elections) is often called simply Zapatero, the name he inherited from his mother's family since Rodríguez is a common surname and may be ambiguous. The same occurs with another former Spanish Socialist leader, Alfredo Pérez Rubalcaba, with the poet and dramatist Federico García Lorca, and with the painter Pablo Ruiz Picasso. As these people's paternal surnames are very common, they are often referred to by their maternal surnames (Rubalcaba, Lorca, Picasso). It would nonetheless be a mistake to index Rodríguez Zapatero under Z or García Lorca under L. (Picasso, who spent most of his adult life in France, is normally indexed under "P".)

In an English-speaking environment, Spanish-named people sometimes hyphenate their surnames to avoid Anglophone confusion or to fill in forms with only one space provided for the last name: for example, U.S. Representative Alexandria Ocasio-Cortez, who is of Puerto Rican heritage, is named "Ocasio-Cortez" because her parents' surnames are Ocasio-Roman and Ocasio-Cortez (née Cortez). She has publicly corrected people who referred to her as "Cortez" rather than "Ocasio-Cortez."

Forenames
With few restrictions, parents can now choose any name; common sources of names are the parents' taste, honouring a relative, the General Roman Calendar nomina (nominal register), and traditional Spanish names. Legislation in Spain under Franco's dictatorship legally limited cultural naming customs to only Christian (Jesus, Mary, saints) and typical Spanish names (Álvaro, Jimena, etc.). Although the first part of a composite forename generally reflects the gender of the child, the second personal name need not (e.g. José María Aznar). At present, the only naming limitation is the dignity of the child, who cannot be given an insulting name. Similar limitations applied against diminutive, familiar, and colloquial variants not recognized as names proper, and "those that lead to confusion regarding sex";
however, current law allows registration of diminutive names.

María and José
Girls are often named María, honouring the Virgin Mary, by appending either a shrine, place, or religious-concept suffix-name to María. In daily life, such women omit the "Mary of the ..." nominal prefix, and use the suffix portion of their composite names as their public, rather than legal, identity. Hence, women with Marian names such as María de los Ángeles (Mary of the Angels), María del Pilar (Mary of the Pillar), and María de la Luz (Mary of the Light), are normally addressed as Ángeles (Angels), Pilar (Pillar), and Luz (Light); however, each might be addressed as María. Nicknames such as Maricarmen for María del Carmen, Marisol for "María (de la) Soledad" ("Our Lady of Solitude", the Virgin Mary), Dolores or Lola for María de los Dolores ("Our Lady of Sorrows"), Mercedes or Merche for María de las Mercedes ("Our Lady of the Gifts"), etc. are often used. Also, parents can simply name a girl María, or Mari without a suffix portion.

It is not unusual for a boy's formal name to include María, preceded by a masculine name, e.g. José María Aznar (Joseph Mary Aznar) or Juan María Vicencio de Ripperdá (John Mary Vicencio de Ripperdá). Equivalently, a girl can be formally named María José (Mary Joseph), e.g. skier María José Rienda, and informally named Marijose, Mariajo, Majo, Ajo, Marisé or even José in honor of St. Joseph. María as a masculine name is often abbreviated in writing as M. (José M. Aznar), Ma. (José Ma. Aznar), or M.ª (José M.ª Morelos). It is unusual for any names other than the religiously significant María and José to be used in this way except for the name Jesús that is also very common and can be used as "Jesús" or "Jesús María" for a boy and "María Jesús" for a girl, and can be abbreviated as "Sus", "Chus" and other nicknames.

Registered names
The  (Civil Registry) officially records a child's identity as composed of a forename (simple or composite) and the two surnames; however, a child can be religiously baptized with several forenames, e.g. Felipe Juan Froilán de Todos los Santos. Until the 1960s, it was customary to baptize children with three forenames: the first was the main and the only one used by the child; if parents agreed, one of the other two was the name of the day's saint. Nowadays, baptizing with three or more forenames is usually a royal and noble family practice.

Marriage
In Spain, upon marrying, one does not change one's surname.  In some instances, such as high society meetings, the partner's surname can be added after the person's surnames using the preposition de (of). An example would be a Leocadia Blanco Álvarez, married to a Pedro Pérez Montilla, may be addressed as Leocadia Blanco de Pérez or as Leocadia Blanco Álvarez de Pérez. This format is not used in everyday settings and has no legal value. Similarly, a widow may be identified using the abbreviation "vda." for "viuda" ("widow" in Spanish), as in Leocadia Blanco vda. de Pérez.

Generational transmission
In the generational transmission of surnames, the paternal surname's precedence eventually eliminates the maternal surnames from the family lineage. Contemporary law (1999) allows the maternal surname to be given precedence, but most people observe the traditional paternal–maternal surname order. Therefore, the daughter and son of Ángela López Sáenz and Tomás Portillo Blanco are usually called Laura Portillo López and Pedro Portillo López but could also be called Laura López Portillo and Pedro López Portillo. Spanish naming customs include the orthographic option of conjoining the surnames with the conjunction particle y, or e before a name starting with 'I', 'Hi' or 'Y', (both meaning "and") (e.g., José Ortega y Gasset, Tomás Portillo y Blanco, or Eduardo Dato e Iradier), following an antiquated aristocratic usage.
 
Patrilineal surname transmission was not always the norm in Spanish-speaking societies. Prior to the mid-eighteenth century, when the current paternal-maternal surname combination norm was adopted, Hispanophone societies often practiced matrilineal surname transmission, giving children the maternal surname and occasionally giving children a grandparent's surname (borne by neither parent) for prestige – being perceived as gentry – and profit, flattering the matriarch or the patriarch in hope of inheriting land. A more recent example can be found in the name of Francisco de Asís Franco y Martínez-Bordiú (born 1954), who took first the name of his mother, Carmen Franco, rather than that his father, Cristóbal Martínez-Bordiú, 10th Marquis of Villaverde, in order to perpetuate the family name of his maternal grandfather, the Caudillo Francisco Franco.

Not every surname is a single word; such conjoining usage is common with doubled surnames (maternal-paternal), ancestral composite surnames bequeathed to the following generations – especially when the paternal surname is socially undistinguished. José María Álvarez del Manzano y López del Hierro is an example, his name comprising the composite single name José María and two composite surnames, Álvarez del Manzano and López del Hierro. Other examples derive from church place-names such as San José. When a person bears doubled surnames, the means of disambiguation is to insert y between the paternal and maternal surnames.

In case of illegitimacy – when the child's father either is unknown or refuses to recognize his child legally – the child bears both of the mother's surnames, which may be interchanged.

Occasionally, a person with a common paternal surname and an uncommon maternal surname becomes widely known by the maternal surname. Some examples include the artist Pablo Ruiz Picasso, the poet Federico García Lorca, and the politician José Luis Rodríguez Zapatero. With a similar effect, the foreign paternal surname of the Uruguayan writer Eduardo Hughes Galeano (his father was British) is usually omitted. (As a boy, however, he occasionally signed his name as Eduardo Gius, using a Hispanicised approximation of the English pronunciation of "Hughes".) Such use of the second last name by itself is colloquial, however, and may not be applied in legal contexts.

Also rarely, a person may become widely known by both surnames, with an example being a tennis player Arantxa Sánchez Vicario – whereas her older brothers Emilio and Javier, also professional tennis players, are mainly known only by the paternal surname of Sánchez in everyday life, although they would formally be addressed as Sánchez Vicario.

Navarrese and Álavan surnames
Where Basque and Romance cultures have linguistically long coexisted, the surnames denote the father's name and the (family) house or town/village. Thus the Romance patronymic and the place-name are conjoined with the prepositional particle de ("from"+"provenance"). For example, in the name José Ignacio López de Arriortúa, the composite surname López de Arriortúa is a single surname, despite Arriortúa being the original family name. This can lead to confusion because the Spanish López and the Basque Arriortúa are discrete surnames in Spanish and Basque respectively. This pattern was also in use in other Basque districts, but was phased out in most of the Basque-speaking areas and only remained in place across lands of heavy Romance influence, i.e. some central areas of Navarre and most of Álava. To a lesser extent, this pattern has been also present in Castile, where Basque-Castilian bilingualism was common in northern and eastern areas up to the 13th century.

A notable example of this system was Joaquina Sánchez de Samaniego y Fernández de Tejada, with both paternal and maternal surnames coming from this system, joined with an y ("and").

Nominal conjunctions

The particle "de" (of)

In Spanish, the preposition particle de ("of") is used as a conjunction in two surname spelling styles, and to disambiguate a surname. The first style is in patronymic and toponymic surname spelling formulæ, e.g. Gonzalo Fernández de Córdoba, Pedro López de Ayala, and Vasco Núñez de Balboa, as in many conquistador names.

The spellings of surnames containing the prepositional particle de are written in lower-case when they follow the name, thus José Manuel de la Rúa ("of the street") and Cunegunda de la Torre ("of the tower"), otherwise the upper-case spellings doctor De la Rúa and señora De la Torre are used.

Without a patronymic Juan Carlos de Borbón. Unlike in French, Spanish orthography does not require a contraction when a vowel begins the surname, with the exception de el ("of the"), which becomes del. E.g. Carlos Arturo del Monte (Charles Arthur of the Mountain).

The patronymic exception The current (1958) Spanish name law,  (Article 195 of the Civil Registry Regulations) does not allow a person to prefix de to their surname, except as the clarifying addition of de to a surname (apellido) that might be misunderstood as a forename; thus, a child would be registered as Pedro de Miguel Jiménez, to avoid the surname Miguel being mistaken as the second part of a composite name, as Pedro Miguel.

Bearing the de particle does not necessarily denote a noble family, especially in eastern Castile, Alava, and western Navarre, the de usually applied to the place-name (town or village) from which the person and his or her ancestors originated. This differs from another practice established in the sixteenth and seventeenth centuries, i.e. the usage of de following the one's own name as a way of denoting the bearer's noble heritage to avoid the misperception that he or she is either a Jew or a Moor. In that time, many people, regardless of their true origins, used the particle, e.g. Miguel de Cervantes, Lope de Vega, etc.; moreover, following that fashion a high noble such as Francisco Sandoval Rojas called himself Francisco de Sandoval y Rojas. During the eighteenth century, the Spanish nobility fully embraced the French custom of using de as a nobility identifier, however, commoners also bore the de particle, which made the de usages unclear; thus, nobility was emphasised with the surname's lineage.

The particle "y" (and)
In the sixteenth century, the Spanish adopted the copulative conjunction y ("and") to distinguish a person's surnames; thus the Andalusian Baroque writer Luis de Góngora y Argote (1561–1627), the Aragonese painter Francisco José de Goya y Lucientes (1746–1828), the Andalusian artist Pablo Diego Ruiz y Picasso (1881–1973), and the Madrilenian liberal philosopher José Ortega y Gasset (1883–1955). In Hispanic America, this spelling convention was common to clergymen (e.g. In the Philippines, y and its associated usages are retained only in formal state documents such as police records, but is otherwise dropped in favour of a more American-influenced naming order.

The conjunction y avoids denominational confusion when the paternal surname might appear to be a (first) name: without it, the physiologist Santiago Ramón y Cajal might appear to be named Santiago Ramón (composite) and surnamed Cajal, likewise the jurist Francisco Tomás y Valiente, and the cleric Vicente Enrique y Tarancón. Without the conjunction, the footballer Rafael Martín Vázquez, when referred to by his surnames Martín Vázquez mistakenly appears to be forenamed Martín rather than Rafael, whilst, to his annoyance, the linguist Fernando Lázaro Carreter occasionally was addressed as Don Lázaro, rather than as Don Fernando (Lázaro can be either forename or surname).

Moreover, when the maternal surname begins with an i vowel sound, written with either the vowel I (Ibarra), the vowel Y (Ybarra archaic spelling) or the combination Hi + consonant (Higueras), Spanish euphony substitutes e in place of y, thus the example of the Spanish statesman Eduardo Dato e Iradier (1856–1921).

Denotations
To communicate a person's social identity, Spanish naming customs provide orthographic means, such as suffix-letter abbreviations, surname spellings, and place names, which denote and connote the person's place in society.

Identity and descent
p. (father of): A man named like his son, has the choice to use the lower-case suffix p. (denoting padre, father) to his surname. An example of this is: José Luis Lorena, p. , who distinguishes from his son José Luis Lorena; the English analogue is "Sr." (senior).

h. (son of): A man named like his father, might append the lower-case suffix h. (denoting hijo, son) to his surname, thus distinguishing himself, Juan Gómez Marcos, h., from his father, Juan Gómez Marcos; the English analogue is "Jr." (junior).

The suffix -ez
Following the Visigothic invasion of the Iberian peninsula, the local population adopted to a large extent a patronymic naming system: the suffix -icī (a Latin genitive meaning son of) would be attached to the name of a man's father. This suffix gradually evolved into different local forms, depending on the language. For example, the son of Fernando would be called:
 Basque: Fernanditz
 Castillan: Fernández
 Catalan: Ferrandis
 Portuguese and Galician: Fernandes

This system was most common in, but not limited to, the central region of Castile. Bare surnames, i.e. the father's name without the suffix -itz/-ez/-is/-es, can also be found, and are especially common in Catalonia. This said, mass migration in the 20th century has led to a certain leveling off of such regional differences.

In Catalan speaking areas the suffixed surname Ferrandis is most common in the South (the Valencian Country) while in the North (Catalonia) the bare surname Ferran is more common. Furthermore, language contact led to the creation of multiple hybrid forms, as evidenced by the multiple Catalano-Castillan surnames, found especially in the Valencian Country: Fernàndez, Fernandis, Fernàndiz, Ferrandez, Ferràniz, Ferranis, etc.

Not every similar surname is patronymic. Due to the letters z and s being pronounced alike in Latin American dialects of Spanish, many non-patronymic surnames with an -es have come to be written with an -ez. In Hispano-American Spanish, the -ez spellings of Chávez (Hugo Chávez), Cortez (Alberto Cortez) and Valdez (Nelson Valdez) are not patronymic surnames, but simply variant spellings of the Iberian Spanish spelling with -es, as in the names of Manuel Chaves, Hernán Cortés and Víctor Valdés. For more on the -z surnames in Spanish see Influences on the Spanish language.

A number of the most common surnames with this suffix are:

 Álvarez – the son of Álvar, Álvaro
 Antúnez – the son of Antón, Antonio
 Benéitez, Benítez – the son of Benito
 Díaz, Díez, Diéguez – the son of Diego
 Domínguez – the son of Domingo
 Enríquez – the son of Enrique
 Estévez – the son of Esteve, Estevo, Esteban
 Fernández – the son of Fernando
 Giménez, Jiménez, Ximénez – the son of Gimeno, Jimeno, Ximeno
 Gómez – the son of Gome, Gomo
 González – the son of Gonzalo
 Gutiérrez – the son of Gutierre, Gutier
 Hernández – the son of Hernando
 Ibáñez – the son of Iván, Juan
 López – the son of Lope
 Márquez – the son of Marco, Marcos
 Méndez – the son of Mendo
 Míguez, Miguélez – the son of Miguel
 Martínez – the son of Martín
 Muñoz – the son of Munio
 Núñez – the son of Nuño
 Peláez – the son of Pelayo
 Pérez – the son of Pedro
 Rodríguez – the son of Rodrigo
 Ruiz – the son of Ruy, Roy
 Ramírez – the son of Ramiro
 Sánchez – the son of Sancho
 Suárez – the son of Suero
 Téllez – the son of Tello
 Vásquez, Vázquez – the son of Vasco, Velasco
 Velázquez, Velásquez – the son of Velasco
 Vélez – the son of Vela

Foundlings
Anonymous abandoned children were a problem for civil registrars to name. Some such children were named after the town where they were found (toponymic surname). Because most were reared in church orphanages, some were also given the surnames Iglesia or Iglesias (church[es]) and Cruz (cross). Blanco (with the meaning "blank", rather than "white") was another option. A toponymic first surname might have been followed by Iglesia(s) or Cruz as a second surname.

Nameless children were sometimes given the surname Expósito/Expósita (from Latin exposĭtus, "exposed", meaning "abandoned child"), which marked them, and their descendants, as of a low caste or social class. Due to this, in 1921 Spanish law started to allow holders of the surname Expósito to legally change their surname. In the Catalan language, the surname Deulofeu ("made by God") was often given out to these children, which is similar to De Dios ("from God") in Castilian.

Furthermore, in Aragón abandoned children would receive the surname Gracia ("grace") or de Gracia, because they were thought to survive by the grace of God.

Foreign citizens
In Spain, foreign immigrants retain use of their cultural naming customs, but upon becoming Spanish citizens, they are legally obliged to assume Spanish-style names (one forename and two surnames). If the naturalised citizen is from a one-surname culture, their current surname is either doubled, or their mother's maiden name is adopted. For example, a Briton with the name "Sarah Jane Smith" could become either "Sarah Jane Smith Smith" or "Sarah Jane Smith Jones" upon acquiring Spanish citizenship. Formally, Spanish naming customs would also mean that the forename "Sarah" and middle name "Jane" would be treated as a compound forename: "Sarah Jane".

Flamenco artists
Historically, flamenco artists seldom used their proper names. According to the flamenco guitarist Juan Serrano, this was because flamenco was considered disreputable and they did not want to embarrass their families:

This tradition has persisted to the present day, even though Flamenco is now legitimate. Sometimes the artistic name consists of the home town appended to the first name (Manolo Sanlúcar, Ramón de Algeciras); but many, perhaps most, of such names are more eccentric: Pepe de la Matrona (because his mother was a midwife); Perico del Lunar (because he had a mole); Tomatito (son of a father known as Tomate (tomato) because of his red face); Sabicas (because of his childhood passion for green beans, from niño de las habicas); Paco de Lucía, born Francisco ("Paco") Gustavo Sánchez Gomes, was known from infancy after his Portuguese mother, Lucía Gomes (de Lucía = [son] of Lucía). And many more.  However, when referring to these artists by their noms de plume, it makes no sense to shorten their name to the qualifier, as in "Lucía" or "de Lucía"; Paco, or perhaps "el de Lucía", are the only options.

Spanish hypocoristics and nicknames
Many Spanish names can be shortened into hypocoristic, affectionate "child-talk" forms using a diminutive suffix, especially -ito and -cito (masculine) and -ita and -cita (feminine). Sometimes longer than the person's name, a nickname is usually derived via linguistic rules. However, in contrast to English use, hypocoristic names in Spanish are only used to address a person in a very familiar environment – the only exception being when the hypocoristic is an artistic name (e.g. Nacho Duato born Juan Ignacio Duato). The common English practice of using a nickname in the press or media, or even on business cards (such as Bill Gates instead of William Gates), is not accepted in Spanish, being considered excessively colloquial. The usages vary by country and region; these are some usual names and their nicknames:

 Adelaida = Ade, Adela
 Adelina = Deli, Lina
 Adrián (Male) or Adriana (Female) = Adri
 Alberto = Alber, Albertito, Beto, Berto, Tico, Tuco, Tito, Albi
 Alejandra = Sandra, Ale, Álex, Álexa, Aleja, Jandra, Jana, Lala
 Alejandro = Ale, Álex, Alejo, Jandro, Jano, Cano, Sandro, Pando
 Alfonso = Alfon, Fon, Fonso, Fonsi, Poncho, Loncho
 Alfredo = Fredi
 Alicia = Ali, Licha
 Ana Isabel = Anabel
 Anacleto = Cleto
 Andrea, Andreo, Andrés, Andressa = Andi, Andresito, Andresita 
 Agustín = Agus, Tin
 Antonia = Toña, Tona, Toñi, Toñita, Tonia, Antoñita
 Antonio = Antón, Tonio, Toni, Tono, Tonino, Tonito, Toño, Toñín, Antoñito, Antuco, Antuquito
 Antonino = Nino
 Anunciación = Chona, Nunci
 Ariadna = Ari
 Arturo = Arturito, Turito, Art, Archie, Lito
 Arcenio = Arcenito, Cheno
 Armando = Mando, Mandi
 Ascensión = Ascen, Choni
 Asunción = Asun, Susi, Suni
 Aurelio = Yeyo, Aure
 Bartolomé = Bartolo, Barto, Tomé
 Beatriz = Bea, Beti, Betina
 Begoña = Bego
 Benjamín = Ben, Benja, Benjas, Benji, Jamín
 Berenice = Bere
 Bernabé = Berna
 Bernardino = Bérnar, Nino
 Bernardo = Bérnar, Ber, Nardo
 Bonifacio = Boni
 Buenaventura = Ventura, Ventu, Venturi
 Candelaria = Can, Cande, Candi, Candelita, Canda, Candela
 Cándido/a = Candi
 Caridad = Cari, Carita, Caruca, Cuca
 Carla = Carlita
 Carlos = Carlito, Carlitos, Carlo, Calo, Calín, Carlines, Litos, Charli, Chepe
 Carmen = Mamen, Carmita, Carmenchu, Menchu, Carmencha, Carmencita, Carmelita, Carmela, Carmina
 Carolina = Caro, Cárol, Caroli, Carito
 Catalina = Cata, Lina, Cati, Catina, Caty
 Cayetano = Caye, Tano, Cayo
 Cecilia = Ceci, Cece, Cilia, Chila, Chili
 Celestino = Celes, Cele, Tino
 César = Checha, Cesito, Cesítar
 Ciro = Cirino
 Claudia = Clau, Claudi
 (Inmaculada) Concepción = Conchi, Conchita, Concha, Conce, Ciona, Cione, Chon, Choni, Inma, Macu
 Consolación = Conso
 Constantino = Tino
 Consuelo = Consu, Chelo, Coni
 Covadonga = Cova, Covi
 Cristian = Cris
 Cristina = Cris, Cristi, Tina
 Cristóbal = Cris, Cristo, Toba
 Cristóforo = Cuco, Chosto
 Cruz = Crucita, Chuz
 Dalia = Dali
 Dalila = Lila
 Daniel (Male) or Daniela (Female) = Dani
  David = Davo, Davilo
  Diego = Didi, Dieguito
 Dolores = Lola, Loli, Lolita, Loles
 Eduardo = Edu, Lalo, Eduardito, Duardo, Guayo
 Eladio = Lalo, Yayo
 Eliana = Eli, Elia, Liana
 Elena = Nena
 Eloísa = Elo
 Encarnación = Encarna, Encarni, Encarnita
 Enrique = Quique, Quico, Kike, Kiko
 Ernesto = Neto, Netico, Tito
 Esmeralda = Esme, Mera, Lala
 Esperanza = Espe, Pera, Lancha, Pancha, Peri
 Esteban = Estebi
 Estefanía = Estefa, Estefi
 Eugenia = Genita
 Eugenio = Genio, Genín, Genito
 Eulalia = Lali, Lala, Leya
 Eva = Evita
 Facundo = Facu
 Federico = Fede, Fico
 Felícita = Feli, Felacha
 Felipe = Fele, Pipe, Lipe
 Faustino = Tino, Tinín
 Fermín = Mincho, Fermo
 Fernanda = Fer, Nanda, Feña
 Fernando = Fer, Nando, Nano, Ferni, Feña, Fercho
 Florencia = Flor, Flora, Florci, Florcita, Florchi, Florchu, Lencha
 Florencio = Floro, Lencho
 Francisca = Fran, Paqui, Paquita, Sisca, Cisca, Pancha, Curra, Paca, Quica, Panchita, Panchi
 Francisco = Fran, Francis, Paco, Sisco, Cisco, Chisco, Curro, Quico, Kiko, Franco, Frasco, Frascuelo, Pacho, Pancho, Panchito
 Gabriel = Gabo, Gabri
 Gabriela = Gabi, Gabrielita
 Gerardo = Gera, Yayo, Lalo
 Germán = Mancho
 Gertrudis = Tula
 Gloria María = Glorimar
 Gonzalo = Gonza, Gon, Gonzo, Gonchi, Lalo, Chalo, Talo, Tali
 Graciela = Chela
 Gregorio = Goyo, Gorio
 Griselda = Gris, Celda
 Guadalupe = Lupe (female & male), Guada, Pupe, Lupita, Lupilla (female) & Lupito, Lupillo (male), Pita (female)
 Guillermo = Guille, Guíller, Guillo, Meme, Momo, Memo
 Gumersindo = Gúmer, Gume, Sindo.
 Héctor = Tito, Torín, Hertico
 Hermenegildo = Hildo
 Hortensia = Horten, Tencha
 Humberto, Huberto, Adalberto = Berto, Beto
 Ignacia = Nacha, Nacia, Ina
 Ignacio = Nacho, Nacio, Nachito, Naco, Iñaqui, Iñaki
 Inocencia = Chencha
 Inocencio = Chencho
 Isabel = Bela, Beli, Belica, Sabel, Sabela, Chabela, Chavela, Chavelita, Chabelita, Isa
 Ismael = Isma, Mael, Maelo
 Israel = Irra, Rai
 Iván = Ivi, Ivo
 Jacobo = Cobo, Yaco, Yago
 Jaime = Jaimón, Jimmy
 Javier = Javi, Javo, Javito
 Jorge = Jorgecito, Jorgis, Jorgito, Gorge, Jecito, Coque, Koke
 Jerónimo = Jero, Jeronimillo
 Jesús = Jesu, Chus, Xus, Chuso, Chusi, Chucho, Chuchi, Chuy, Suso, Susi, Chuyito
 Jesús Alberto = Jesusbeto, Chuybeto
 Jesús Manuel = Jesusma
 Jesús María = Chumari, Chusma, Jesusmari
 Jesús Ramón = Jerra, Jesusra, Chuymoncho, Chuymonchi
 Jesusa = Susi, Sus, Chusa, Susa, Chucha, Chuy, Chuyita
 Jimena = Jime, Mena
 Joaquín = Joaco, Juaco, Quin, Quim, Quino, Quincho
 José = Jose, Pepe, Chepe, Pepito, Chepito, Pito, Pepín, Pepu, Chechu, Cheo
 José Ángel/José Antonio = Josean, Josan
 José Carlos = Joseca
 José Luis = Joselo, Joselu, Pepelu, Selu
 José Manuel = Josema, Chema, Chemita, Chemanu
 José María = Chema, Chemari, Josemari, Josema
 José Miguel = Josemi, Jomi, Chemi
 José Ramón = Peperramón, Joserra
 Josefa = Pepa, Pepi, Pepita, Pina, Fina, Fini, Finita
 Josefina = Jose, Fina, Pepa, Pepita, Chepina, Chepita
 Juan = Juanito, Juanín, Juancho, Juanelo, Juampi, Juanci
 Juan Andrés = Juanan
 Juan Camilo = Juanca, Juancho, Juanqui, Juanquis
 Juan Carlos = Juanca, Juáncar, Juanqui
 Juan Cristóbal = Juancri, Juancris
 Juan Ernesto = Juáner
 Juan Esteban = Juanes
 Juan Felipe = Juanfe, Pipe
 Juan Fernando = Juánfer
 Juan Francisco = Juanfran
 Juan Ignacio = Juancho
 Juan Javier = Juanja
 Juan José = Juanjo, Juancho
 Juan Leonardo = Juanle
 Juan Luis = Juanlu
 Juan Manuel = Juanma
 Juan Miguel = Juangui, Juanmi
 Juan Pablo = Juampa, Juampi, Juampis
 Juan Rafael = Juanra
 Juan Ramón = Juanra
 Juan Salvador = Juansa
 Juan Vicente = Juanvi
 Julián = Juli, Julianito, Julianillo
 Julio = Julín, Julito, Juli
 Laura = Lalita, Lala, Lauri, Lauris, Lau, Laurita
 Leticia = Leti
 Leonardo = Leo, León, Leoncito
 Lorena = Lore
 Lorenzo = Lencho, Enzo
 Lourdes = Lourditas, Lulú
 Lucía = Luci, Lucita
 Luciano = Chano, Ciano, Lucho
 Luis = Lucho, Luisito, Güicho, Luisín, Sito
 Luis Felipe = Luisfe
 Luis Manuel = Luisma
 Luis María = Luisma
 Luis Mariano = Luisma
 Luis Miguel = Luismi
 Macarena = Maca
 Magdalena = Magda, Mada, Malena, Mane, Manena, Lena, Leni, Lenita
 Manuel = Manu, Lolo,  Meño, Manuelito, Lito, Lillo, Mani, Manué, Manel, Mel, Nel, Nelo
 Manolo  = Lolo, Manolito, Manolillo, Lito, Lillo, Manolín
 Marcelina = Lina, Marce, Celina, Chela
 Marcelo = Chelo, Marce
 Margarita = Marga, Margari, Magui, Rita, Mague
 María = Mari, Maruja, Marujita, Marica, Marita, Mariquita, Mariquilla, Iah
 María Aurora = Marora
 María Auxiliadora = Chilo, Mauxi, Mausi, Dori
 María de Dolores = Lola, Loles, Loli, Lolita, Mariló
 María de Jesús = Marichú
 María de la Cruz = Maricruz
 María de la Luz = Mariluz, Luz, Malú
 María de las Nieves = Marinieves, Nieves
 María de los Ángeles = Marielos, Marian, Ángeles, Ángela, Angie, Angy, Mariángeles
 María de Lourdes = Malula, Marilú, Lulú
 María del Carmen = Maricarmen, Mamen, Mai, Maica, Mayca, Mayka, Mari
 María del Mar = Marimar, Mar
 María del Rosario = Charo, Chari, Charito, Chayo
 María del Refugio = Cuca, Cuquis
 María del Socorro = Maricoco, Coco, Socorro
 María del Sol/María de la Soledad = Marisol, Sol, Sole, Chole
 María Engracia = Graci, Gracita
 María Elena = Malena, Marilena
 María Eugenia = Maru, Marugenia, Yeni, Kena, Kenita
 María Fernanda = Mafe, Mafer, Marifer
 María Fuensanta = Mari Santi, Tanti, Fuen
 María Isabel = Maribel, Mabel, Marisabel, Marisa
 María José/María Josefa = Cote, Coté, Jose, Josefa, Mai, Ajo, Majo, Mariajo, Marijó, Marijose, Maripepa, Maripepi, Pepa, Pepi, Pepita
 María Laura = Malala
 María Luisa = Marisa, Mariluisa, Malu, Maluli, Magüi
 María Milagros = Mila, Milagritos, Mili, Mimi, Marimili
 María Paz = Maripaz, Paz, Pacita
 María Pilar = Pilar, Pili, Mapi, Maripí, Maripili
 María Teresa = Maritere, Maite, Mayte, Teté, Mari, Mariate, Marité
 María Victoria = Mariví, Mavi
 Marina = Marita, Ina, Mari
 Marta = Martuqui, Tuqui
 Mario = Mayito
 Mauricio = Mau, Mauro, Mauri
 Máximo = Maxi, Max, Maximino, Mino
 Mayra = Mayrita, Mayris
 Mayola = May
 Melissa = Meli, Melo,
 Mercedes = Merce, Merche, Merchi, Merceditas, Meche, Meches
 Micaela = Mica
 Miguel = Migue, Míchel, Miki
 Miguel Enrique = Ige, Ike, Mige, Mike, Migo, Miko
 Minerva = Mine, Míner
 Míriam = Miri
 Mónica = Moni, Mo
 Montserrat = Monse, Montse, Mon
 Natalia = Nati, Talia,
 Natividad = Nati, Tivi
 Nicolás = Nico, Colás
 Nicolasa = Nico, Colasa
 Norberto = Nórber, Berto, Bertín
 Norma = Normi, Normita, Tita
 Oriana = Ori, Nana, Nanita, Ana, Anita
 Orlando = Lando
 Pablo = Pablete, Pablín, Pablito, Blete, Blin, Blito
 Pacificación = Paz
 Paloma = Palo
 Paola = Pao, Paolita, Payoya
 Paula = Pau
 Paulina = Pau, Pauli
 Patricia = Patri, Tricia, Pato, Pati
 Patricio = Pato, Patri
 Pedro = Perucho, Pedrito, Perico, Peyuco, Peret, Pedrín
 Pilar/María del Pilar = Pili, Pilarín, Piluca, Petita, Maripili
 Presentación = Presen
 Primitivo = Pivo, Tivo
 Purificación = Pura, Puri, Purita
 Rafael = Rafaelito, Rafa, Rafi, Rafita, Rafo, Fael, Falo, Fali, Felo, Fefo, Fefi
 Ramón = Mon, Moncho, Monchi, Mongo, Monguito, Ramoncito
 Raúl = Rauli, Raulito, Raulillo, Rul, Rulo, Rule, Ral, Rali 
 Refugio = Cuca, Cuquita
 Reinaldo = Rey, Naldo
 Remedios = Reme
 Reposo = Repo
 Ricardo = Rica, Rícar, Richi, Rici, Rocho, Ríchar
 Roberto = Robe, Róber, Berto, Robertito, Tito, Beto
 Rocío = Roci, Chio, Ro, Roco
 Rodolfo = Fito, Fofo, Rodo, Bofo, Rudi
 Rodrigo = Rorro, Rodriguito, Rodri, Ruy, Roy, Ro
 Rogelio = Roge, Coque
 Rosalía = Chalia, Rosa, Rosi, Rosita
 Rosalva = Chava
 Rosario = Charo, Chayo, Chayito
 Salomé = Salo
 Salomón = Salo
 Salvador = Salva, Chava, Chavito, Chavita, Salvita, Salvi, Chavi, Salvidor
 Santiago = Santi, Yago, Diego, Chago, Tiago
 Sara = Sarita
 Sebastián = Sebas, Seba
 Serena = Sere, Siri
 Sergio = Chucho, Checo, Chejo, Checho,Chencho, Keko, Yeyo
 Simón = Monsi
 Sofía = Sofi
 Soledad = Sol, Sole, Chole, Chol
 Susana = Susi, Sus, Su
 Teodoro = Teo, Doro
 Teresa = Tere, Teresita, Teresica, Teresina
 Timoteo = Teo, Teín
 Trinidad = Trini
 Tomás = Tomi, Tomasito, Tomasín
 Valentina = Val, Vale, Valen, Tina, Tinita, Valentinita
 Valentino = Val, Vale, Valen, Tino, Tinito, Valente, Valentinito
 Verónica = Vero, Nica, Verito, Veru
 Vicente = Chente, Vicen, Vicho, Sento
 Víctor, Victorio = Vítor, Vis, Vico, Vito
 Victoria = Viqui, Tori, Toria, Toya
 Visitación = Visi
 Yolanda = Yola, Yoyi, Yoli

Spain's other languages
The official recognition of Spain's other written languages – Catalan, Basque, and Galician – legally allowed the autonomous communities to re-establish their vernacular social identity, including the legal use of personal names in the local languages and written traditions – banned since 1938 – sometimes via the re-spelling of names from Castilian Spanish to their original languages.

Basque names

The Basque-speaking territories (the Basque Autonomous Community and Navarre) follow Spanish naming customs (given names + two family names, the two family names being usually the father's and the mother's).

The given names are officially in one language (Basque or Spanish) but often people use a translated or shortened version. A bilingual Basque-Spanish speaker will not necessarily bear a Basque name, and a monolingual Spanish speaker can use a Basque name or a Basque hypocoristic of an official Spanish name; e.g. a Francisco (official Spanish name) may be known as Patxi (Basque hypocoristic).

Some Basque-language names and surnames are foreign transliterations into the Basque tongue, e.g. Ander (English: "Andrew"; Spanish: Andrés), Mikel (English: "Michael"; Spanish: Miguel), or Ane (English: "Anne"; Spanish: Ana). In some cases, the name's original-language denotation is translated to Basque, e.g., Zutoia and Zedarri denote the Spanish Pilar (English: "Pillar"). Moreover, some originally Basque names, such as Xabier and Eneko (English "Xavier" and "Inigo") have been transliterated into Spanish (Javier and Íñigo).

Recently, Basque names without a direct equivalent in other languages have become popular, e.g. Aitor (a legendary patriarch), Hodei ("cloud"), Iker ("to investigate"), and Amaia ("the end"). Some Basque names without a direct Spanish meaning, are unique to the Basque language, for instance, Eneko, Garikoitz, Urtzi. Basque names, rather than Spanish names, are preponderant in the Basque Country, countering the Spanish-name imposition of the Franco régime requiring people being given only Spanish names at birth. After Franco's death and the restoration of democracy in Spain, many Basque adults changed their Spanish names to the Basque equivalent, e.g. from Miguel to Mikel.

A source for modern Basque names is Sabino Arana's Deun-Ixendegi Euzkotarra ("Basque saint-name collection", published in 1910). Instead of the traditional Basque adaptations of Romance names, he proposed others he made up and that in his opinion were truer to the originals and adapted better to the Basque phonology. For example, his brother Luis became Koldobika, from Frankish Hlodwig. The traditionals Peru (from Spanish "Pedro"), Pello or Piarres (from French "Pierre"), all meaning "Peter", became Kepa from Aramaic כיפא (Kepha). He believed that the suffix -[n]e was inherently feminine, and new names like Nekane ("pain"+ne, "Dolores") or Garbiñe ("clean"+ne, "Immaculate [Conception]") are frequent among Basque females.

Basque surnames usually denote the patronymic house of the bearer; e.g. Etxebarria – "the new house", from etxe (house) + barri (new) + a (the), denotes "related to a so-named farmhouse"; in the same way, Garaikoetxea – "the house in the heights", garai ("height") + etxe ("house") + a (the). Sometimes, surnames denote not the house itself but a characteristic of the place, e.g. Saratxaga – "willow-place", from saratze ("willow") + -aga ("place of"); Loyola, from loi ("mud") + ola ("iron smithery"); Arriortua – "stone orchard", from harri ("stone") + ortua ("orchard"). Before the 20th century all Basque men were considered nobles (indeed, some Basque surnames, e.g. Irujo or Medoza, were related to some of the oldest Spanish noble families), and many of them used their status to emigrate with privileges to other regions of the Spanish Empire, especially the Americas, due to which some Basque surnames became common to the Spanish-American world; e.g. Mendoza – "cold mountain", from mendi ("mountain" + hotza ("cold"); Salazar – "old hall", from sala ("hall") + zahar ("old"). Until 1978, Spanish was the single official language of the Spanish civil registries and Basque surnames had to be registered according to the Spanish phonetical rules (for example, the Spanish "ch" sound merges the Basque "ts", "tx", and "tz", and someone whose surname in Standard Basque would be "Krutxaga" would have to write it as "Cruchaga", letter "k" also not being used in Spanish). Although the democratic restoration ended this policy, allowing surnames to be officially changed into their Basque phonology, there still are many people who hold Spanish-written Basque surnames, even in the same family: a father born before 1978 would be surnamed "Echepare" and his children, "Etxepare". This policy even changed the usual pronunciation of some Basque surnames. For instance, in Basque, the letter "z" maintained a sibilant "s"-like sound, while Spanish changed it; thus, a surname such as "Zabala" should be properly read similar to "sabala", although in Spanish, because the "z" denotes a "th" sound, it would be read as "Tha-bala". However, since the letter "z" exists in Spanish, the registries did not force the Zabalas to transliterate their surname.

In the Basque provinces of Biscay and Gipuzkoa, it was uncommon to take a surname from the place (town or village) where one resided, unless one was a foundling; in general, people bearing surnames such as Bilbao (after the Basque city of Bilbao) are descendants of foundlings. However, in the Basque province of Alava and, to a lesser extent, in Navarre, it was common to add one's birth village to the surname using the Spanish particle de to denote a toponymic, particularly when the surname was a common one; for instance, someone whose surname was Lopez and whose family was originally from the valley of Ayala could employ Lopez de Ayala as a surname. This latter practice is also common in Castile.

Basque compound surnames are relatively common, and were created with two discrete surnames, e.g. Elorduizapaterietxe – Elordui + Zapaterietxe, a practice denoting family allegiances or the equal importance of both families. This custom sometimes conduced to incredibly long surnames, for compound surnames could be used to create others; for example, the longest surname recorded in Spain is Basque, Burionagonatotoricagageazcoechea, formed by Buriona+ Gonatar + Totorika + Beazcoetxea.

Finally, the nationalist leader Sabino Arana pioneered a naming custom of transposing the name-surname order to what he thought was the proper Basque language syntax order; e.g. the woman named Miren Zabala would be referred to as Zabala'taŕ Miren – the surname first, plus the -tar suffix denoting "from a place", and then the name. Thus, Zabala'taŕ Miren means "Miren, of the Zabala family". The change in the order is effected because in the Basque tongue, declined words (such as Zabala'taŕ) that apply to a noun are uttered before the noun itself; another example of this would be his pen name, Arana ta Goiri'taŕ Sabin. This Basque naming custom was used in nationalist literature, not in formal, official documents wherein the Castilian naming convention is observed.

Catalan names

The Catalan-speaking territories also abide by the Spanish naming customs, yet usually the discrete surnames are joined with the word i ("and"), instead of the Spanish y, and this practice is very common in formal contexts. For example, the former president of the Generalitat de Catalunya (Government of Catalonia) is formally called El Molt Honorable Senyor Carles Puigdemont i Casamajó. Furthermore, the national language policy enumerated in article 19.1 of Law 1/1998 stipulates that "the citizens of Catalonia have the right to use the proper regulation of their Catalan names and surnames and to introduce the conjunction between surnames".

The correction, translation, and surname-change are regulated by the Registro Civil (Civil Registry) with the Decree 138/2007 of 26 June, modifying the Decree 208/1998 of 30 July, which regulates the accreditation of the linguistic correctness of names. The attributes and functions of Decree 138/2007 of 26 July regulate the issuance of language-correction certificates for translated Catalan names, by the Institut d'Estudis Catalans (Institute of Catalan Studies) in Barcelona. Nevertheless, there are Catalan surnames that conform to neither the current spelling rules nor to the traditionally correct Catalan spelling rules; a language-correction certification can be requested from the institute, for names such as these:

 Aleñà to Alenyà
 Caballé to Cavaller
 Cañellas to Canyelles
 Casas to Cases
 Corominas to Coromines
 Fàbregas to Fàbregues
 Farré to Ferrer
 Figueras to Figueres
 Gabarra to Gavarra
 Gafarot to Gaferot
 Gumbau to Gombau
 Domènech to Domènec
 Jufré to Jofré
 Junqueras to Jonqueres
 Mayoral to Majoral
 Montañà to Montanyà
 Perpiñá to Perpinyà
 Pijuan to Pijoan
 Piñol to Pinyol
 Puyol to Pujol
 Roselló to Rosselló
 Rusiñol to Rossinyol 
 Tarradellas to Tarradelles
 Viñallonga to Vinyallonga
 Viñes to Vinyes

Catalan hypocoristics and nicknames
Many Catalan names are shortened to hypocoristic forms using only the final portion of the name (unlike Spanish, which mostly uses only the first portion of the name), and with a diminutive suffix (-et, -eta/-ita). Thus, shortened Catalan names taking the first portion of the name are probably influenced by the Spanish tradition. The influence of Spanish in hypocoristics is recent since it became a general fashion only in the twentieth century ; example Catalan names are:

 Antoni/Antònia = Toni, Tònia, Tonet/a
 Bartomeu = Tomeu
 Concepció = Ció
 Cristina = Tina
 Dolors = Lloll, Dolo, Loles
 Elisabet/h = Bet, Beth, Eli, Lis
 Eulàlia = Laia, Olaia, Lali
 Francesc/a = Cesc, Quico/a, Xesco/a, Xisco/a, Cisco/a, Sisquet/a
 Gabriel = Biel
 Ignasi = Nasi
 Isabel = Bel, Bet
 Jacint = Cinto
 Joaquim/a = Quim/a, Ximo/a (in Valencia)
 Jordi = Toti
 Jordina = Jordi
 Josefina = Fina, Fineta
 Josep Maria = Pemi
 Josep/a = Pep/o/a, Pepet/a, Pepito/a
 Magdalena = Talena, Magda
 Manel = Nel, Nelo, Nel·lo
 Maria del Mar = Mar
 Maria dels Àngels = Mariàngels, Àngels, Màngels
 Maria Lluïsa = Marissa
 Maria Soletat = Marissol
 Mariona = Ona, Miona
 Meritxell = Txell, Meri
 Montserrat = Serrat, Montse, Munsa, Muntsa
 Narcís/isa = Narciset/a, Ciset/a, Ciso/a
 Núria = Nuri
 Onofre = Nofre
 Oriol = Uri
 Rafel = Fel, Feló, Rafa
 Salvador = Vadó, Voro (in Valencia)
 Sebastià/ana = Tià/ana, Sebas
 Sergi = Keki
 Vicent = Vicentó, Cento
 Xavier = Xavi, Xevi, Javi (the J is pronounced as in English)

Galician names
The Galician-speaking areas also abide by the Spanish naming customs. Main differences are the usage of Galician given names and surnames.

Galician surnames 

Most Galician surnames have their origin in local toponymies, being these either Galician regions (Salnés < Salnés, Carnota, Bergantiños), towns (Ferrol, Noia), parishes or villages (as Andrade). Just like elsewhere, many surnames were also generated from jobs or professions (Carpinteiro 'carpenter', Cabaleiro 'Knight', Ferreiro 'Smith', Besteiro 'Crossbowman'), physical characteristics (Gago 'Twangy', Tato 'Stutterer', Couceiro 'Tall and thin', Bugallo 'fat', Pardo 'Swarthy'), or origin of the person (Franco and Francés 'French', Portugués 'Portuguese').

Although many Galician surnames have been historically adapted into Spanish phonetics and orthography, they are still clearly recognizable as Galician words: Freijedo, Spanish adaptation of freixedo 'place with ash-trees'; Seijo from seixo 'stone'; Doval from do Val 'of the Valley'; Rejenjo from Reguengo, Galician evolution of local Latin-Germanic word Regalingo 'Royal property'.

Specially relevant are the Galician surnames originated from medieval patronymics, present in local documentation since the 9th century, and popularized from the 12th century on. Although many of them have been historically adapted into Spanish orthography, phonetics and traditions, many are still characteristically Galician; most common ones are:
 Alonso (medieval form Afonso, from the latinicised Germanic name Adefonsus).
 Álvarez (from médieval Alvares, from the Germanic name Halvar(d), latinicised as Alvarus).
 Ares (from the name Arias or the town of Ares).
 Bermúdez (medieval form Vermues, from the latinicised Germanic name Veremodus + suffix -ici-).
 Bernárdez (from the Frankish name Bernard + suffix -ici-).
 Vieitez, Vieites (from the name Bieito, from Latin Benedictus + suffix -ici-).
 Diz, Díaz (from the name Didacus + suffix -ici-).
 Domínguez (medieval form Domingues, derived of the name Domingo, from Dominicus, + suffix -ici-).
 Enríquez (medieval form Anrriques, from the Frankish name Henric + suffiz -ici-).
 Estévez (medieval form Esteves, from the name Estevo, derived of Stephanus + suffix -ici-).
 Fernández (medieval form Fernandes, from the name Fernando, derived from the Germanic name Fredenandus + suffix -ici-).
 Froiz (medieval form Froaz, from the Germanic name Froila 'Lord' + suffix -ici-).
 García (medieval form Garçia, from the name Garcia).
 Giance (from the name Xian, old orthography Jiam, derived of Latin Iulianus + suffix -ici-).
 Gómez (medieval form Gomes, from the name Gomes).
 González (medieval form Gonçalves, from the latinicised Germanic name Gundisalvus + suffix -ici-).
 López (medieval form Lopes, from the Latin nickname Lupus 'wolf').
 Lourenzo, Lorenzo (medieval form Lourenço, from the Latin name Laurentius).
 Martínez, Martín, Martís (from the Latin name Martinus + suffix -ici-).
 Méndez (medieval form Meendes, from the name Mendo, from Menendus + suffix -ici-).
 Miguéns (from the name Miguel, derived of Michael + suffix -ici-).
 Núñez (medieval form Nunes, derived from the name Nunnus + suffix -ici-).
 Paz, Paes, Pais (from the name Paio, derived from Pelagius + suffix -ici-).
 Pérez (medieval form Peres, from the name Pero, derived of Petrus, + suffix -ici-).
 Raimúndez (from the Frankish name Raimund + suffix -ici-).
 Rodríguez (from the name Rodrigo, from the latinicised Germanic form Rodericus + suffix -ici-).
 Rois (from the name Roi, nickname of Rodrigo + suffix -ici-): Spanish 'Ruiz'.
 Sánchez (medieval form Sanches, from the name Sancho, derived from Latin Sanctius + suffix -ici-).
 Sueiro, Suárez (medieval forms Sueiro, Suares, from the name Suarius, with and without suffix -ici-).
 Vázquez (medieval form Vasques, from the name Vasco, from Velasco, + suffix -ici-).
 Yanes (medieval forms Eanes, Ianes. from Iohannes, Yohannes + suffix -ici-).
Some of them (namely Páez, Méndez, Vázquez) are characteristically Galician due to the drop of intervocalic -l-, -d-, -g- and -n-(although Lugo is the only province in Spain with a majority of people surnamed López).

Galician given names and nicknames 
Some common Galician names are:

 Afonso [m]: nicknames Fonso, Pocho.
 Alberte [m] Alberta [f]: Berto, Berta.
 Alexandre [m]: Xandre, Álex.
 Anxo [m]: Xeluco.
 Antón [m], Antía [f]: Tonecho.
 Artai [m].
 Brandán [m], Brenda [f] (Celtic origin, "distinguished warrior)
 Baldomero [m]: Mero
 Brais [m]
 Breogán  [m] (name of a mythological Galician Celtic warrior).
 Carme [f]: Carmiña, Mela, Carmela, Carmucha, Carmuxa.
 Catarina [f]: Catuxa.
 Cibrao,Cibrán [m] (Greek origin meaning "Cypriot")
 Edelmiro, Delmiro [m]: Edel, Miro.
 Erea [f] (Greek origin meaning "peace")
 Estevo [m]
 Fernán [m]
 Francisco [m]: Farruco, Fran.
 Icía [f]
 Iago [m]
 Lois [m]: Sito
 Lúa [f] (moon)
 María [f]: Maruxa, Marica.
 Manuel, Manoel [m]: Manolo, Lolo.
 Olalla, Baia [f]
 Paio [m]
 Paulo [m], Paula [f]
 Roi [m]
 Sabela [f]: Beluca
 Tareixa [m]
 Uxío [m] Uxía [f]
 Xavier [m]
 Xacobe [m]
 Xaquín [m]: Xocas.
 Xela [f]
 Xián [m]
 Xoán, Xan [m]
 Xosé [m]: Che, Pepe.
 Xurxo [m]

Nicknames are usually obtained from the end of a given name, or through derivation. Common suffixes include masculine -iño, -ito (as in Sito, from Luisito), -echo (Tonecho, from Antonecho) and -uco (Farruco, from Francisco); and feminine -iña, -ucha/uxa (Maruxa, Carmucha, from Maria and Carme), -uca (Beluca, from Isabeluca), and -ela (Mela, from Carmela).

Ceuta and Melilla
As the provincial Surname distribution map (above) indicates, Mohamed is an often-occurring surname in the autonomous Mediterranean North African cities of Ceuta and Melilla (respectively registered 10,410 and 7,982 occurrences),  Hispanophone Muslims use the Spanish "Mohamed" spelling for "Muhammad". As such, it is often a component of Arabic names for men; hence, many Ceutan and Melillan Muslims share surnames despite not sharing a common ancestry. Furthermore, Mohamed (Muhammad) is the most popular name for new-born boys, thus it is not unusual to encounter a man named Mohamed Mohamed Mohamed: the first occurrence is the given name, the second occurrence is the paternal surname, and the third occurrence is the maternal surname.

Indexing 

In English, the Chicago Manual of Style recommends that Spanish and Hispanophone names be indexed by the family name. When there are two family names, the indexing is done under the father's family name; this would be the first element of the surname if the father's and mother's or husband's family names are joined by a y. Depending upon the person involved, the particle de may be treated as a part of a family name or it may be separated from a family name. The indexing of Hispanophone names differs from that of Portuguese or Lusophone names, where the final element of the name is indexed because the Portuguese custom is for the father's surname to follow, rather than precede, the mother's. The effect is that the father's surname is the one indexed for both Spanish and Portuguese names.

See also

 Basque surnames
 Filipino names
 French names
 Gitanos
 List of personal naming conventions (for other languages)
 List of common Spanish surnames
 Maiden and married names
 Name for general coverage of the topic
 Naming customs of Hispanic America
 Nobiliary particle
 Portuguese names

Footnotes

References

External links
Hispanic Heraldry – Information about Hispanic surnames 
Catalan Society of Heraldry – Information about Catalan surnames 
Spanish words and phrases to describe your family
Territorial distribution of surnames (Data from the Register on 1 January 2006) and several Excel tables about name and surname distribution by age and province, from the Instituto Nacional de Estadística (Spain).

 
Names
Names
Names by culture